Ma Xiaoxu (born 5 June 1988) is a Chinese footballer who has played for Dalian Quanjian and Beijing BG Phoenix of the Chinese Women's Super League. She also spent a short time with Umeå IK of the Swedish Damallsvenskan in 2007.

Club career

Umeå
In February 2007 Ma agreed an initial six-month contract with Swedish Damallsvenskan champions Umeå IK, on a reported monthly salary of USD 5,000. She made a substitute appearance as Umeå beat Linköpings FC in the Svenska Supercupen, then scored on her league debut as Umeå defeated QBIK 4–0 on the opening match day.

Ma featured in both legs of Umeå's 2007 UEFA Women's Cup Final defeat by Arsenal. The following month Ma and Marta both scored twice in a 5–2 Damallsvenskan win over Kopparbergs/Göteborg FC. Ma struggled with the intensity of the training at Umeå, and was criticised by the coach Andrée Jeglertz for her lack of mobility and poor work-rate. She was released from her Umeå contract early in July 2007, to return to China in preparation for the 2007 FIFA Women's World Cup which they were hosting.

Beijing
In December 2020 Ma and several other experienced players left Beijing BG Phoenix amid economic downsizing at the club.

International goals

Honours

Club
Umeå IK
Damallsvenskan: 2007
Svenska Cupen: 2007
Svenska Supercupen: 2007

Dalian Quanjian
Chinese Women's Super League: 2008, 2012, 2013, 2016

International
China PR national football team
AFC Women's Asian Cup: 2006
Four Nations Tournament: 2009, 2014, 2016

China national under-20 football team
AFC U-19 Women's Championship: 2006

Individual
AFC Women's Asian Cup Most Valuable Player: 2006
FIFA U-20 Women's World Championship Golden Shoe: 2006
FIFA U-20 Women's World Championship Golden Ball: 2006
Asian Women's Footballer of the Year: 2006
Asian Young Footballer of the Year: 2006

References

External links
Ma Xiaoxu's teenage kicks
AFC Annual Awards 2006

Chinese women's footballers
1988 births
Living people
China women's international footballers
2007 FIFA Women's World Cup players
Footballers at the 2016 Summer Olympics
Expatriate women's footballers in Sweden
Chinese expatriate sportspeople in Sweden
Footballers from Dalian
Umeå IK players
Damallsvenskan players
Asian Young Footballer of the Year winners
Asian Games medalists in football
Footballers at the 2006 Asian Games
FIFA Century Club
Olympic footballers of China
Women's association football forwards
Chinese Women's Super League players
Dalian Quanjian F.C. players
Asian Games bronze medalists for China
Medalists at the 2006 Asian Games